Lennert lymphoma  is a systemic T-cell lymphoma that presents with cutaneous skin lesions roughly 10% of the time.

It is also known as "lymphoepithelioid variant of peripheral T-cell lymphoma".
It was first characterized in 1952.

See also 
 Cutaneous T-cell lymphoma
 Pleomorphic T-cell lymphoma
 Skin lesion
 Peripheral T-cell lymphoma-Not-Otherwise-Specified

References 

Lymphoid-related cutaneous conditions
Lymphoma